Episcepsis rypoperas is a moth of the family Erebidae. It was described by George Hampson in 1898. It is found in Belize.

References

 

Euchromiina
Moths described in 1898